Sokratis Boudouris (born 23 November 1977) is a Greek former professional footballer.

Career
Born in Karditsa, Greece, Boudouris started his professional career in Anagennisi Karditsa (Kanaria) and played for the club from 1995 until 2001. Boudouris played in Beta Ethniki and Gamma Ethniki for the club Poseidon Neoi Poroi from 2002 until 2004. Also he played for the club Olympiakos Volou from 2004 to 2007.

In summer 2007 numerous football clubs from the Greek Superleague and Beta Ethniki were interested in signing him, although he finally accepted an offer from Anagennisi Karditsa to return to the club after six years. Boudouris might have the best of his career seasons in 2007/08 when he led Anagennisi Karditsa in promotion to Beta Ethniki after eight years, beating Ilioupoli F.C.2-0 in a knockout play-off game in Athens, when he scored twice. In 2007–08 season, Boudouris scored 17 goals in the league and was awarded with the golden-boot of Gamma Ethniki. He also helped Anagennisi Karditsa to avoid relegation in 2008–09 season, scoring 10 goals in Beta Ethniki and being the top scorer of the club. At the end of the season several teams such as Diagoras F.C. and Kerkyra were interested in signing Boudouris but he finally sealed a new contract with Anagennisi Karditsa proving his devotion to the club and rejecting higher offers.  Boudouris was considered as the natural captain by the fans although in 2010 he denied to hold the captain branch handed in the new and experienced sign Angelos Digozis. His temperament, moral and performance was acknowledged by every fan of Anagennisi Karditsa.

In the summer of 2010, after the serious administration problems, he signed a contract with the Panthrakikos, who is competing in Beta Ethniki for the 2010–11 season.

Career statistics

Date of last update: 3 August 2010

References

External links

Profile at gate3.gr
Profile at epae.org

1977 births
Living people
Greek footballers
Anagennisi Karditsa F.C. players
Patraikos F.C. players
Marko F.C. players
Olympiacos Volos F.C. players
Panthrakikos F.C. players
Association football forwards
People from Karditsa (regional unit)
Footballers from Thessaly